Makhlukhanum Murzayeva (born 4 October 1966) is a Russian archer. She competed in the women's individual and team events at the 1996 Summer Olympics.

References

1966 births
Living people
Russian female archers
Olympic archers of Russia
Archers at the 1996 Summer Olympics
Sportspeople from Makhachkala